Carlos Dias (9 March 1910 – 1995) was a Portuguese épée fencer. He competed at the 1948 and 1952 Summer Olympics.

References

External links
 

1910 births
1995 deaths
Sportspeople from Lisbon
Portuguese male épée fencers
Olympic fencers of Portugal
Fencers at the 1948 Summer Olympics
Fencers at the 1952 Summer Olympics